Saffarin is a Palestinian village in the western West Bank, in the Tulkarm Governorate of the State of Palestine, located 11 kilometers South-east of Tulkarm. According to the Palestinian Central Bureau of Statistics, Saffarin had a population of approximately 1,037 inhabitants in mid-year 2006. 9.8% of the population of Saffarin were refugees in 1997. The healthcare facilities for Saffarin are designated as MOH level 2.

History
Saffarin has been identified with the Israelite village of Sepher, which was mentioned in one of the Samaria Ostraca.

Ceramics from the Byzantine era have been found here.

During the Crusader period, Diya' al-Din (1173–1245) writes that there was a Muslim population in the Saffarin.

Ottoman era
Saffarin, like all of Palestine was incorporated into the Ottoman Empire in 1517.  In the 1596  tax registers, part of the nahiya ("subdistrict") of Jabal Sami, part of the larger Sanjak of Nablus. It had a population of 8 households, all Muslims. The inhabitants paid a fixed tax rate of 33,3% on agricultural products, including wheat, barley, summer crops, olive trees,  goats and beehives, in addition to occasional revenues and a press for olive oil or grape syrup, and a fixed tax for people of Nablus area; a total of 9,167  akçe. 3/24 of the revenue went to the Waqf Halil ar-Rahman.

In 1870  Victor Guérin noted it as a village of 600 persons.

In 1882 the PEF's Survey of Western Palestine (SWP)  described Sefarin as: "a small village on a knoll, upon a ridge, supplied by cisterns, with a few olive trees."

British Mandate era
In the 1922 census of Palestine conducted  by the British Mandate authorities, Sufarin  had a population of 458 Muslims, increasing in the 1931 census to 444 Muslims, living in 100 houses.

In  the 1945 statistics  the population of Saffarin  was 530 Muslims,  with  9,687  dunams of land  according to an official land and population survey. Of this, 1,624  dunams were used plantations and irrigable land, 1,384 for cereals, while 13 dunams were built-up (urban) land.

Jordanian era
In the wake of the 1948 Arab–Israeli War, and after the 1949 Armistice Agreements, Saffarin came  under Jordanian rule.

In 1961, the population was  616.

Post 1967
Since the Six-Day War in 1967, Saffarin has been under Israeli oppressive occupation.

References

Bibliography

External links
Welcome To Saffarin
Survey of Western Palestine, Map 11:    IAA,  Wikimedia commons

Villages in the West Bank
Tulkarm Governorate
Municipalities of the State of Palestine